The 2015–16 Greek A2 Basket League was the 30th season of the Greek A2 Basket League, the second-tier level professional club basketball league in Greece. This season was the first season with the participation of 16 teams. It was also the first season where playoff and play out games were held. The winner was Kymis, which got promoted directly to GBL (A1). The second place team was Faros Keratsiniou, but the club didn't accept to play in the top-tier GBL, and it was replaced by the third placed team, Promitheas Patras. In contrast, Evropi Pefkochoriou and Filippos Veroias were relegated to Greek B League (Beta Ethniki) directly, and Peristeri and Panerythraikos were relegated after play out games.

Teams

Standings

Source: Hellenic Basketball Federation

Playoffs

Play-out
Livadeia  – Peristeri 3-0
Machites Doxas Pefkon – Panerythraikos 3-2

Source: Hellenic Basketball Federation

Final league standings

See also
2015–16 Greek Basketball Cup
2015–16 Greek Basket League (1st tier)

Notes

References

External links
Greek A2 Basketball League
Hellenic Basketball Federation 

Greek A2 Basket League
Greek
2